Ibn Ibrahim is a patronymic part of a full personal name in Islamic cultures, an Arabic patronymic, or nasab meaning "son of Ibrahim". Notable people with this patronymic include:

Abdallah ibn Ibrahim
Abdallah ibn Ishaq ibn Ibrahim
Abdallah ibn Muhammad ibn Ibrahim al-Zaynabi

Abu al-Abbas Ahmad ibn Ibrahim
Abu Abdullah Muhamed Ibn Ibrahim Ibn Bassal
Abu Bakr Ahmad ibn Ibrahim al-Madhara'i
Abu Iqal al-Aghlab ibn Ibrahim
Abu Salim Ali ibn Ibrahim

Abu’l Fath Omar ibn Ibrahim al-Khayyam, or Omar Khayyam
Abu'l Hasan Ahmad ibn Ibrahim Al-Uqlidisi

Ahmad ibn Ibrahim al-Ghazi
Ahmad ibn Ibrahim al-Naysaburi

Al-Abbas ibn Ibrahim as-Samlali

Alī ibn Ibrāhīm Ibn al-Shāṭir
Ali Ibn Ibrahim Qomi

Farid al-Din Muhammad ibn Ibrahim Attar
Hatim ibn Ibrahim
Ishaq ibn Ibrahim al-Mawsili
Ishaq ibn Ibrahim al-Mus'abi
Ismail ibn Ibrahim

Muhammad ibn Ibrahim Al ash-Sheikh
Muḥammad ibn Ibrāhīm al-Fazārī
Muḥammad ibn Ibrāhīm ibn al-Akfani
Muhammad Ibn Ibrahim Ibn Jafar al-Numani
Muhammad ibn Ibrahim al-Mus'abi
Muhammad ibn Ishaq ibn Ibrahim
Muhammad Ibn Ismail Ibn Ibrahim Ibn al-Mughirah Ibn Bardizbah al-Bukhari
Muhammad Hayyat ibn Ibrahim al-Sindhi

Musafir ibn Ibrahim II
 Sa'd Zaghloul Pasha ibn Ibrahim
Sidi ibn Ibrahim al-Taras
Umar ibn Ibrahim ibn Waqid al-Umari

Yahya Ibn Ibrahim
Ya'ish ibn Ibrahim al-Umawi
Yaqub ibn Ibrahim al-Ansari
Yāˈqub ibn Isḥāq ibn Ibrāhīm

 Ziyadat Allah I ibn Ibrahim

See also

Patronymics